Defending champion Jim Courier defeated Goran Ivanišević in the final, 6–1, 6–2, 6–2 to win the men's singles tennis title at the 1993 Italian Open.

Seeds

  Pete Sampras (semifinals)
  Jim Courier (champion)
  Boris Becker (third round)
  Goran Ivanišević (finals)
  Ivan Lendl (first round)
  Michael Chang (semifinals)
  Sergi Bruguera (quarterfinals)
  Andrei Medvedev (third round)
  Richard Krajicek (first round)
  Karel Nováček (third round)
  Wayne Ferreira (first round)
  MaliVai Washington (first round)
  Thomas Muster (second round)
  Cédric Pioline (second round)
  Carlos Costa (second round)
  Fabrice Santoro (third round)

Draw

Finals

Top half

Section 1

Section 2

Bottom half

Section 3

Section 4

References

Men's Singles